Qatar made its Paralympic Games début at the 1996 Summer Paralympics in Atlanta, with a single representative (Salah Al Mulla) in powerlifting. The country has participated in every subsequent edition of the Summer Paralympics, but has never entered the Winter Paralympics. Qatar's delegations have only ever consisted in male athletes before 2016 Summer Paralympics, and have always been small, containing no more than three competitors. All Qatari athletes have competed in field events (javelin or shot put) or in powerlifting.

Qatar won its first medals in 2016 Summer Paralympics in both men and women's shot put. Qatar won a bronze medal in 2020 Summer Paralympics in men's shot put.

Medalists

See also
 Qatar at the Olympics

References